"Gay bowel syndrome" is an obsolete classification of various sexually transmitted rectal infections observed in men who have sex with men. It was first used by Dr. Henry L. Kazal in 1976 to describe conditions he observed in his proctology practice, which had many gay patients. The term has fallen into disuse, as both clinically imprecise and prejudicial: the issues it describes are not specific to gay and bisexual men, limited to the bowel, nor a medical syndrome.

Early history

The term was first used in the pre-HIV era, by Kazal et al. in 1976. After Kazal, the term was used sporadically in medical literature from the 1970s to refer to a complex of gastrointestinal symptoms affecting gay men. The term was not specific to any particular disease or infection, and was used clinically to describe proctitis, diarrhea, and a variety of other complaints caused by a wide range of infectious organisms. Reported causes include herpes viruses, syphilis, gonorrhea, chlamydia, campylobacter, and shigellosis, as well as a variety of protozoal infections. The concept of "gay bowel syndrome" was later expanded to include various opportunistic cancers. Transmission was considered to take place by anal sex, a fecal-oral route, or both. Following the onset of the AIDS epidemic, the reported incidence of these complaints has declined, likely as a result of safer sexual practices.

Criticism and decline in use 
In 1985, an article in the peer-reviewed journal Gut said that "gay bowel syndrome" was not a syndrome, and had limitations in medical use:

A 1997 article in the Journal of Homosexuality argued that use of the term should be abandoned:

The term was withdrawn as "outdated" by the Canadian Association of Gastroenterologists in 2004. Activist Michael Petrelis said "it is very much a defamation to say ‘gay bowel syndrome', when what they’re really talking about is parasites", and Marty Algaze of the Gay Men’s Health Crisis argued: "Sickle cell anemia is primarily seen in African Americans, but would you call it African American anemia? People would never accept that."

The U.S. Centers for Disease Control confirmed the term was already informal and no longer in use by 2005.

The 2009 McGraw-Hill Manual of Colorectal Surgery states that "gay bowel syndrome" is considered obsolete and derogatory:

Gay activist and author Michael Scarce criticized the concept of "gay bowel syndrome" in his book Smearing the Queer: Medical Bias in the Health Care of Gay Men (1999), saying that "gay bowel syndrome has been, and remains today, a powerful tool for the specific surveillance, regulation, definition, medicalization, identification, and fragmentation of gay men's bodies." Scarce's work has been cited in the Journal of the American Medical Association with a positive review.

See also
 Health risks of anal sex
 Sexually transmitted infections in men who have sex with men

References 

Obsolete medical terms
Male homosexuality
Sexually transmitted diseases and infections